The Dennis DS series was a compact fire engine with a tilting cab built by Dennis Specialist Vehicles from 1979 to the early 1990s. It was almost visually and mechanically identical in construction to the Dennis RS/SS series with the exception of a shorter wheelbase, aimed at fire brigades which may operate in tight rural areas unsuitable for full-size fire engines.

Operators of the Dennis DS include the Devon, Cheshire, Hertfordshire and Durham County fire brigades, as well as the Dublin Fire Brigade. Eight were built for the North Yorkshire and Hampshire fire brigades between 1987 and 1989 with HCB Angus bodies.

See also
Dennis RS/SS series, the DS's full-size counterparts.

References

DS series
DS series
Fire engines